Sterculia lanceolata is a tree species, belonging to the genus Sterculia and the family Malvaceae (previously the Sterculiaceae, now relegated to a subfamily).  The species can be found in southern China (including Hainan island) and Vietnam (where it is variously known as: trôm mề gà, sang sé, sảng, trôm lá mác, trôm thon, che van, chóc móc or tròm thon).

Subspecies
Two subspecies are listed in the Catalogue of Life:
 S. l. coccinea
 S. l. principis

Gallery

References

External links

Flora of China: Sterculia lanceolata

lanceolata
Flora of China
Flora of Indo-China
Trees of Vietnam
Taxa named by Antonio José Cavanilles